Herman J. Urenda (April 24, 1938 – August 7, 2019) was an American college and professional football player.  A wide receiver, he played college football at the University of the Pacific, and played professionally in the American Football League for the Oakland Raiders in 1963.

See also
Other American Football League players

References

Oakland Raiders players
American Football League players
2019 deaths
1938 births